Joanne Marie Conte (October 18, 1933 – January 27, 2013) was an American politician. She is considered to be the first openly transgender person to be elected to a city council in the United States. She served on Arvada's City Council from 1991-1995. In March 1993, Conte made a public announcement revealing that she was transgender as a preemptive strike against Westword, which had been planning to publish the story on their front page.

Following her short-lived political career, she became a radio host on 850 KOA, but quit after only a few episodes due to transmisogynistic advertising for her broadcast. She then went on to work as an investigative reporter for KGNU Radio.

Early life
Joanne Conte was born in 1933 in Rochester, N.Y. She attended Arvada High School, and then went on to serve as a military Morse code operator for the U.S. Army and Air Force during the Korean War.
Conte came out as transgender in the 1970s and legally changed her name before undergoing gender confirmation surgery in 1972, which caused her family to disown her.

Conte first became involved with political organizing on a small-scale in the 1980s when she organized efforts to keep Arvada's City Council from allowing a trash transfer station to be established in a neighborhood near her own.

Term as councilwoman
In 1991, Conte ran for Arvada City Council and, due to extensive campaigning, won. She was a self-declared "raging activist" and focused heavily on citizen outreach during her term. She sought to make government happenings accessible to the public, so citizens could make more informed political decisions. Her actions as councilwoman show her belief in the value of citizens in government and a passion for openness and transparency.

Despite being candid in her politics, Conte was very secretive about her past. This made her adversaries suspicious enough to hire a private investigator who dug up evidence of Conte's name change and gender confirming surgery, which was then leaked to the tabloid newspaper, Westword. Word got to Conte that the tabloid was planning to run a front-page article outing her as transgender and she was forced to make the announcement herself before they could. The revelation destroyed Conte's political career, though she admitted she was relieved to no longer have to live in secrecy and felt that she helped pave the way for other trans women in politics.

In 1994, Conte submitted a petition to run as an independent candidate for the Colorado House of Representatives, but was denied a spot on the ballot by then Secretary of State, Natalie Meyer. Conte filed an appeal with the Supreme Court and, in the case of Conte v. Meyer, it was determined Conte would appear on the ballot by a ruling of 5-2. She lost the election, largely due to the ridicule she was facing for her gender from her adversary's supporters during the campaign. Before leaving office, Conte audited the city budget and convinced the Council to cut out non-essential services in response to Arvada's declining revenue.

In 1994, while serving as councilwoman, Conte filed a workers' compensation claim which alleged that leaning on her desk during council meetings caused a staph infection on her right elbow.

Though her political career was over, Conte continued to be a strong activist. She began her career in radio broadcasting with 850 KOA, where her show was promoted by ads which asked "Is it a man? Is it a woman?" After only a few episodes, Conte left for KGNU radio, which was much better suited to her passion for politics and activism. There, she broadcast news segments and weekly call-in shows, reporting on news and issues that were overlooked by other news sources and continuing to fight for those whose voices were going unheard. Her shows covered topics ranging from affordable housing in the Denver area to the issue of state-approved chemical castration of pedophiles.

Conte v. Meyer
Conte ran for Colorado State Legislature in 1994, but was almost denied ballot access. Conte planned to run as an independent and officially changed her affiliation on August 2, 1993. The deadline to turn in her petition for candidacy was August 2, 1994. She filed her petition—signed by three appellants—on July 18, 1994 and was told two separate times that her petition was sufficient and that any defects in the petition would be remedied before the filing deadline.

Later, Conte filed a lawsuit against the Colorado law which stated the ballot order in which Democrats and Republicans appear should be random while stipulating other candidates always had to appear below the Democrat and Republican choices. After Conte filed the lawsuit Meyer reversed her decision to allow Conte ballot access on the grounds that she had not been an Independent for a full year when she turned in her petition. Conte appealed Meyer's decision to the Colorado Supreme Court in the case the Conte v. Meyer. The Court reversed Meyer's decision by a vote of 5-2 with the majority opinion interpreting the law to mean that a petition is on file from the time it is turned in until the date it is due.

Activism
In 1996, Conte restarted an organization she had begun in 1991, Save Arvada's Residential Areas (SARA), to oppose an annexation proposed by the Arvada City Council. Later that year Conte ran a petition drive to limit campaign contributions and cap spending in Arvada mayoral and council races.

In 2003, Conte led a group of concerned people against storage of chemical waste in Arvada. Following the Arvada City Council's vote in favor of the storage, Conte began the process to get a referendum against the chemical storage on the ballot for the November 2003 election.

In 2004 Conte called for a public investigation into accusations that Arvada Mayor Ken Fellman may have unlawfully removed his opponent's campaign signs.

In the 2006 election year, during a controversy about the salaries of City Managers in Colorado, Conte supported Arvada City Manager Craig Kocian but believed that his salary should be redistributed. Conte commented that Kocian made $165,000 a year, while each city council member made less than $10,000.

References

External links
 "Thursday Call In" - Joanne Conte's radio show on KGNU
 Articles about Joanne Conte  written in Westword

1933 births
American LGBT city council members
American LGBT rights activists
LGBT people from New York (state)
Transgender politicians
Transgender women
Transgender military personnel
Colorado city council members
American LGBT broadcasters
2013 deaths
Women city councillors in Colorado
Politicians from Rochester, New York